Jalin (also spelled Jileen or Jillin) is a village in southern Syria, administratively part of the Daraa Governorate, located northwest of Daraa. Nearby localities include Muzayrib to the southeast, Tafas to the east, al-Shaykh Saad to the northeast, Adwan to the north, Tasil to the northwest and Saham al-Jawlan and Heet to the west. According to the Syria Central Bureau of Statistics, Tasil had a population of 4,337 in the 2004 census.

In sources relating to the Arab conquest of Syria, it is mentioned that the last Byzantine army the empire was able to set up in the region, took up position near "Jillin" before the crucial Battle of the Yarmuk in 635. The battle took place west of Jillin and led to the catastrophic defeat of the Byzantine army.

Jalin was described in the late 19th century as an impoverished village of 20 hut-like houses built either of mudbrick or stone. Its population consisted of 100 black Africans hailing from the Sudan. They were settled in two villages, Jalin and al-Shaykh Saad to the north, by Sheikh Saad ibn Abd al-Qadir, himself from the Sudan. The Africans initially came as slaves of the sheikh, but were later freed. They gradually settled in other parts of the Hauran region of southern Syria. At Jalin, the inhabitants cultivated grapes and vegetables in nearby vineyards and gardens.

References

Bibliography

External links
Map of the town, Google Maps
Kafer el Ma-map; 21K

Populated places in Daraa District